Conasprella tornata, common name the grooved cone, is a species of sea snail, a marine gastropod mollusk in the family Conidae, the cone snails and their allies.

Like all species within the genus Conasprella, these snails are predatory and venomous. They are capable of "stinging" humans, therefore live ones should be handled carefully or not at all.

Description
Normal length is between 15 and 40 mm. The body whorl is narrowly elongated conical in shape. The spire is elevated and scalariform, conical in profile. The protoconch is multispiral. Color pattern is variable but rather simple.

Distribution
This marine species occurs off Islas Cedros, Baja California to mid-Gulf of California, Mexico. South to Peru.

References

 Petit, R. E. (2009). George Brettingham Sowerby, I, II & III: their conchological publications and molluscan taxa. Zootaxa. 2189: 1–218

External links
 The Conus Biodiversity website
 Cone Shells – Knights of the Sea
 

tornata
Gastropods described in 1833
Taxa named by George Brettingham Sowerby I